The 2007 Hokkaido Nippon-Ham Fighters season was the 62nd season for the Hokkaido Nippon-Ham Fighters franchise.

Regular season

Standings

Record vs. opponents

Game log

|-align="center" bgcolor="#ffeeaa"
| 1 || March 24 || @ Marines || 4–4 (7) || colspan=3|Game tied after 6 innings || 30,062 || 0–0–1
|-align="center" bgcolor="#ffeeaa"
| 2 || March 25 || @ Marines || 0–0 (12) || colspan=3|Game tied after 12 innings || 22,114 || 0–0–2
|-align="center" bgcolor="#ffbbbb"
| 3 || March 27 || @ Buffaloes || 2–5 || Davey (1–0) || Kanemura (0–1) || Carter (1) || 12,055 || 0–1–2
|-align="center" bgcolor="#bbffbb"
| 4 || March 28 || @ Buffaloes || 3–2 || Yagi (1–0) || Hirano  (0–1) || Nakamura (1) || 8,245 || 1–1–2
|-

Roster

Postseason

Climax Series

Stage 2

Game 1

Game 2

Game 3

Game 4

Game 5

Japan Series

Game 1

Game 2

Game 3

Game 4

Game 5

Player statistics

Batting 

 Indicates PL leader in the category

Pitching 

 Indicates PL leader in the category

References

Hokkaido Nippon-Ham Fighters
Hokkaido Nippon-Ham Fighters seasons